The Barrie Colts are a junior ice hockey team in Ontario Hockey League, based in Barrie, Ontario, Canada.

Pre-OHL history
There were two previous Barrie Colts teams which played Junior A & B hockey in the Ontario Hockey Association, one from 1907 until 1910 and another from the 1920s to 1940s. The first Barrie Colts played in the senior division of the OHA from 1907 until 1910, prior to the creation of junior A and B levels. One notable alumnus is Gordon Meeking, who played for the Ottawa Senators and Toronto Maple Leafs of the National Hockey Association (NHA), and later in the Pacific Coast Hockey Association (PCHA).

The Barrie Colts were revived in 1921 and played in the Ontario Hockey Association from 1921 to 1944. The club started out as a Junior-B team, then was promoted to Junior-A around the start of World War II. The Junior B Colts won the Sutherland Cup Championship in 1934–35. One of its original players was Leighton "Hap" Emms. Hockey Hall of Fame goaltender Harry Lumley played for this team in 1942–43. Other NHL alumni include Ab DeMarco.

Modern Colts
The modern Barrie Colts started out as a Junior B team. They started in the Mid-Ontario Jr.B league, then moved to the Central Junior B Hockey League in 1978 when the Mid-Ontario league folded. This version of the Junior B Colts won the Sutherland Cup Championship in 1992–93. For the next two seasons (1993–95), the Colts played at the Junior A Tier II level. The team was granted permission to join the Ontario Hockey League as an expansion franchise on May 6, 1994, starting play during the 1995–96 season.

The Colts were the first OHL team to make the post-season in their inaugural year. The Colts won the J. Ross Robertson Cup in the 1999–2000 season, playing the seventh game on the road, defeating the Plymouth Whalers. Barrie travelled to Halifax, Nova Scotia to compete in the Memorial Cup that year, losing to the Rimouski Océanic in the championship game.

Bert Templeton (1995–1996 to 1998–1999)

1995–96 OHL season
For their inaugural season in the league, the Colts brought in coach Bert Templeton to lead. Jeff Cowan was named as the franchise's first captain. Templeton led the team to a 28–31–7 finish. The Colts became the first OHL team to make the post-season in their inaugural year. In the playoffs, the Colts lost in the first round to the Kitchener Rangers. The Colts finished their first season in the league with a below-.500 record and lost in the first round of the playoffs. Seventeen-year-olds Alexandre Volchkov (63 points), and Jan Bulis (59 points), and sixteen-year-old Daniel Tkaczuk (61 points) was selected first overall in the 1995 OHL selection. For his efforts in taking an expansion franchise to the playoffs, Templeton was honoured as the OHL Executive of the Year.

1996–97 OHL season
In his second year behind the Colts bench, Bert Templeton led the Barrie franchise to a 33–23–10 record for a total of 76 points; two points back of the Kitchener Rangers for first place in the central division. Jan Bulis, newly appointed captain Daniel Tkaczuk, and Alexandre Volchkov led the team in scoring with 103, 93, and 82 points respectively. Luch Nasato finished the year fourth in team scoring with 45 points and a team-leading 219 penalty minutes. The Colts made it to the OHL playoffs; they beat the Owen Sound Platers four games to nothing before losing the next round to the Ottawa 67's four games to one.

1997–98 OHL season
Bert Templeton continued as the Colts' coach. The team finished the 1997–98 season at the top of the central division with a record of 38–22–5–1 for an 82-point season. Daniel Tkaczuk led the team in offensive output, scoring 75 points. Luch Nasato scored 69 points while having 254 penalty minutes. First-year player Michael Henrich and rookie Martin Skoula also added some scoring touch. In the playoffs, the Colts played their first series against division rivals Sudbury Wolves and lost the series in six games.

1998–99 OHL season
The Colts began the 1998–99 season with Bert Templeton behind the bench. Daniel Tkaczuk, Michael Henrich, and first-year player Denis Shvidki were team members. Mid-season, in a trade with the Toronto St. Michael's Majors, the Colts' management brought in one of the league's top scorers, Sheldon Keefe, along with Mike Jefferson and Ryan Barnes. At the end of the year the Colts had a 49–12–6–1 record for 105 points and possessed two of the top scorers in the league. After defeating the Kingston Frontenacs 4 games to 1 in the conference quarter-finals, the Colts lost in seven games to the fourth-place Oshawa Generals, who had finished the season twenty points behind the Colts. Barrie goalie Brian Finley won the OHL Goaltender of the Year award as well as the Wayne Gretzky 99 Award as playoff MVP, and high-scoring forward Sheldon Keefe won the Emms Family Award as rookie of the year.

Bill Stewart and the Brampton Boys championship season (1999–2000)

1999–2000 OHL Season

During the summer of 1999, Bert Templeton stepped down as the Barrie head coach. He was replaced by Bill Stewart. During this season, there was internal dissension centering on Ryan Barnes, Shawn Cation, Mike Jefferson and Sheldon Keefe (all four had David Frost as an agent), and coach Stewart was later suspended by the OHL when it was discovered that he smuggled Ukrainian defenceman Vladimir Chernenko across the Canada–United States border in the luggage compartment of the team bus, rather than apply for Chernenko's visa into the country.

The Colts finished with a record of 43–18–6–1 for a total of 93 points. Newly appointed team captain Sheldon Keefe led the entire OHL in scoring, winning the Eddie Powers Memorial Trophy and the Jim Mahon Memorial Trophy for his 48 goals and 73 assists on the season. Denis Shvidki, Mike Jefferson and Michael Henrich also finished in the top twenty in scoring that year with 106, 87, and 86 points respectively. The Colts received secondary scoring from rookie Blaine Down and centre Matt Dzieduszycki. In the playoffs, the Colts faced the North Bay Centennials in the conference quarter finals, winning the series four games to two. In the next round they faced the Sudbury Wolves, winning that series four games to three. In their first trip to the eastern conference finals, the Colts faced the Belleville Bulls whom they defeated in 5 games, winning their first Bobby Orr Trophy. The Colts defeated the Whalers in a seven-game series, playing the seventh game on the road, winning the J. Ross Robertson Cup and advancing to the Memorial Cup finals in Halifax, Nova Scotia.

Memorial Cup Finals, 2000

In the first game of the round robin round, Barrie lost to the host Halifax Mooseheads 5–2. In the second game, the Colts lost to the Rimouski Océanic of the Quebec Major Junior Hockey League 7–2. One day later, Barrie defeated the Kootenay Ice of the Western Hockey League 3–2 in double overtime. This win allowed Barrie to finish ahead of Kootenay and move on to the semi-finals where they once again played the host team Halifax. Barrie defeated the hosts 6–3. One day later the Colts played the Rimouski Océanic in the championship game, but were defeated with a final score of 6–2.

Bud Stefanski (2000–2001 to 2003–04)

2000–01 OHL Season

Beginning in the 2000–01 season, Bud Stefanski took over the Barrie Colts team. Team members Sheldon Keefe, Mike Jefferson, Denis Shvidki, and Michael Henrich had left the team. The Colts made it into the playoffs in seventh place with a 29–28–7–4 record. They lost in 5 games to the Sudbury Wolves. Throughout the season, return players Blaine Down, Mike Henderson and newly appointed captain Matt Dzieduszycki led the charge on offense with 73, 68, and 63 points respectively.

2001–02 OHL Season

At the start of the 2001–02 season Eric Reitz was appointed as the fifth captain in Colt's history. Blaine Down led the Colts in scoring with 61 points. Shayne Fryia, Joey Tenute, Fraser Clair, Jan Platil, Nick Lees and Eric Reitz each had 40 or more points. The Colts team finished two points behind the Toronto St. Michael's Majors for second in the central division and second in the conference with a record of 38–19–9–2. In the playoffs, the Colts met the Sudbury Wolves, this time beating them in a five-game series. The following series was played against the Belleville Bulls whom they defeated in a six-game series. In the conference finals, the Colts played division rival Toronto St. Michael's Majors. The Colts dominated the series, sweeping the Majors in 4 games, winning the team's second Bobby Orr Trophy. In the finals, the Colts faced the Erie Otters who had finished level with the Colts in terms of points during the season. The Colts lost in five games to the Otters. At the end of the season, captain Eric Reitz was awarded the Max Kaminsky Trophy as the league's most outstanding defenceman.

2002–03 OHL Season

Beginning the third year of Bud Stefanski behind the bench of the Colts, defenceman Jeremy Swanson was named as team captain. The Colts ended the season with a record slightly above .500, finishing at 29–26–4–9 for 71 points and a seventh-place finish in the eastern conference. In the playoffs, the Colts would lose their first-round playoff series to the Brampton Battalion in six games. Eric Himelfarb, and Luc Chiasson who the Colts acquired in the off-season led the team in scoring with 75 and 66 points respectively. Second year Colt Nick Lees finished slightly behind Chiasson with 61 points. Players such as Dan Speer, and Chad Thompson were brought in, and would both remain Colts for the next few seasons.

2003–04 OHL Season

The 2003–04 season would be Bud Stefanski's fourth and final season behind the Colts bench. Jeremy Swanson would remain as team captain. His point total would decline to 34 points by the end of the season. Overager Cory Stillman, acquired during the off-season from the Kingston Frontenacs, led the team in scoring with 59 points. Rookie centre Bryan Little finished one point behind Stillman with 58 points. At the conclusion of the season, he won the Emms Family Award as rookie of the year. He was one of nine Colt regulars who played in their rookie season that year. Third year Colt B. J. Crombeen, Mark Langdon and Barrie native Scott Hotham who was acquired from the Mississauga Ice Dogs each also scored 40 plus points. Goaltender Paulo Colaiacovo also finished with a career year: a .924 save percentage and a goals against average of 2.34. He was named as the OHL goaltender of the year in the off-season. The team finished with a record of 31–21–12–4 for 78 points; a slight improvement from the previous year. In the playoffs, the Colts won against the Kingston Frontenacs in five games before losing a seven-game series to the second place Mississauga Ice Dogs.

Marty Williamson (2004–05 to 2009–10)

2004–05 OHL Season

The franchise celebrated its 10th anniversary in the OHL in 2004–05. The Colts finished second in the central division; three points behind leaders Mississauga IceDogs, and one point ahead of Brampton Battalion and Sudbury Wolves. Second year player Bryan Little scored 36 goals and 32 assists for a total of 68 points. Third year Colt Hunter Tremblay scored a total of 62 points. Offence players included  Travis Fuller, Dan Speer, and B. J. Crombeen. Rookie defencemen included Andrew Marshall, Nathan Martine, Todd Perry, and Nick Plastino, along with local brothers Andrew Hotham, and Scott Hotham. Throughout the season, the Colts traded for Rob Hisey from the Erie Otters, young role players like Mike Roelofsen and Daniel Lombardi, and Dan LaCosta. In the playoffs that year, the Colts lost a first round series to the eventual Memorial Cup semi-finalist Ottawa 67's.

2005–06 OHL Season

Bryan Little was named the 8th team captain in the Colts history to begin the 2005–06 season. He scored a career high 109 points. Hunter Tremblay finished second in team scoring with 77 points. He was closely followed by forward Ryan Hamilton (72 points), defenceman Andrew Marshall (66 points), and rookie Vladimir Nikiforov (55 points) who each enjoyed career seasons. The Colts end ed the season with a 43–21–1–3 record, totaling 90 points. The Colts finished 1 point behind division rivals Brampton Battalion and 9 points behind Peterborough Petes for third in the eastern conference. In the playoffs, the Colts won against the Toronto St. Michael's Majors and Brampton Battalion in four games and five games respectively before losing to the eventual OHL champions Peterborough Petes in five game eastern conference final series.

On April 7, 2006, the Ontario Hockey League announced the approval of the transfer of 46% interest in the team, with Howie Campbell as the new majority owner of the franchise. Campbell is a partner in Superior Electric Supply (SESCO). James Massie is a minor partner in ownership, and also owns Georgian International.

On May 16, 2006 the Barrie Colts announced the resignation of the team's general manager, Mike McCann. During McCann's 25-year tenure with the team, he has also been director of player personnel, and a head scout. Mike McCann has also been inducted into the Barrie Sports Hall of Fame.

2006–07 OHL Season

The team finished with a 48–19–0–1 record; winning their third Emms Trophy for the best record in the central division as well as the top seed in the Eastern Conference. The Colts were led by their captain Bryan Little who scored a total of 41 goals and 66 assists for a team leading 107 points. He was selected to represent Canada at the 2007 IIHF World Junior Under 20 Championships held in Sweden that year. Hunter Tremblay (89 points), Richard Clune (78 points), and Kris Spare (51 points), each enjoyed career years. Making their OHL and Colts debuts this year was forward Alex Hutchings, future captains Tomas Marcinko, and Stefan Della Rovere, defencemen Brian Lashoff and Ryan Gottschalk, and goaltender Michael Hutchinson. Also added to the roster were forwards Cory McGillis, and T.J. Battani, as well as defenceman Mike Weber. Although finishing top in their conference, after the Colts defeated Brampton Battalion in four games, they were swept by the sixth place Sudbury Wolves in the conference semi-finals.

2007–08 OHL Season

The 2007–08 season saw a return of Junior B Colts alumnus Drake Berehowsky to the team, this time as assistant coach. He left the team at the end of the 2008–09 season. They finished with a 28–34–3–3 record; good for seventh in the Eastern Conference. Second year forward Alex Hutchings led the Colts in offence throughout the year, finishing with a team high 54 points. Other forwards included Tomas Marcinko, Cory McGillis, Stefan Della Rovere, and rookie Daniel Michalsky. Throughout the year, several trades were made, sending goaltender Andrew Perugini, and high-scoring forward Vladimir Nikiforov away, while bringing in Colt Kennedy, Ryan Berard, Andrew Clouthier, and future captain Dalton Prout. Goaltender Peter Di Salvo, defenceman Stephen Gaskin, Marcus Pepe as well as forward Kyle Clifford all made their debut for the Colts this year. In the playoffs, the Colts met Brampton Battalion, this time sweeping them in a four-game playoff series. In the conference semi-finals the Colts lost to the Belville Bulls 4 games to 1.

2008–09 OHL Season

Colts made a few trades throughout the season and before the deadline, trading away Mitch Lebar, Marcus Pepe, Cory McGillis, Colt Kennedy, and Brian Lashoff in exchange for Peter Stevens and goal scorers Josh Brittain, and Taylor Carnevale. The Colts finished 5th in the Eastern Conference with a 30–33–3–2 record. In the playoffs, the Colts lost in the first round, falling in five games to the Mississauga St. Michael's Majors. At the end of 2008–09 season, the Colts traded goaltender Michael Hutchinson to the London Knights in exchange for four draft picks. The longest playoff game in Barrie Colts history lasted 118 minutes, and 5 seconds, on March 28, 2009 at the Barrie Molson Centre (now known as Sadlon Arena). The Mississauga St. Michael's Majors defeated the Barrie Colts 4 to 3 in the third overtime of game five of the eastern conference quarter-finals and ended the series with the triple overtime goal.

2009–10 OHL Season

In 2009–10 Brad Brown and David Bell joined the coaching team, along with powerplay coach Frank Carnevale.

In 2009–10 the Barrie Colts celebrated their 15th season in the OHL. Bryan Cameron, Luke Pither, Nick Crawford, T. J. Brodie, Alex Pietrangelo, Zac Rinaldo, Matt Kennedy, and Mavric Parks were brought on the team. The Colts had a 22-game win-streak and finished the regular season with an unprecedented record of 57–9–0–2, for a total of 116 points. Bryan Cameron scored a franchise record 53 goals and the team captured their fourth Emms Trophy for finishing first in the Central Division, and also the franchise's first Hamilton Spectator Trophy for finishing first overall in the OHL. Beginning the 2009–10 playoffs, the Colts defeated the Sudbury Wolves 4–0 in the Conference Quarter-Finals, before winning against the Brampton Battalion in the Conference Semi-Finals. In the Conference Finals, the Colts defeated the Mississauga St. Michael's Majors 4–1 and won the Bobby Orr Trophy. In the J. Ross Robertson Cup finals, the Barrie Colts hosted the defending Memorial Cup Champions Windsor Spitfires. The Colts were defeated in four games.

22 Game Winning Streak

In the 2009 – 2010 season, the Barrie Colts, were successful in winning 22 consecutive games. During their streak, which extended from October 24 when they beat Brampton Battalion 3–1, until December 31 when they lost to Owen Sound Attack 6–4, the Colts scored 122 goals while allowing a mere 44. 21 got at least a point, 7 of whom had 20 or more points each. Alex Hutchings led the Colts offense with 17 goals and 14 assists for a total of 31 points. Three players on the Colts roster scored 29 points; Bryan Cameron (19 goals, 10 assists), Darren Archibald (15 goals, 14 assists), and Luke Pither (12 goals, 17 assists). They were followed closely by Nick Crawford (5 goals, 19 assists), Taylor Carnavale (9 goals, 14 assists) and Alexander Burmistrov (6 goals, 14 assists) as the Colts top scorers. Although captain Stefan Della Rovere, missed the last few games while attending the 2010 World Junior Ice Hockey Championships, still managed to score 18 points during the streak. In net, Peter Di Salvo managed 17 wins, while back-up Dalton McGrath won five. The Barrie Colts moved to second place in the OHL standings, behind the Windsor Spitfires, and third in the BMO CHL MasterCard Rankings behind the first place Saint John Sea Dogs and Windsor Spitfires.

Top Ranking in the Country

On February 24, 2010, the Canadian Hockey League announced the BMO CHL MasterCard Top 10 Rankings for week 23 of the 2009–10 season. For the first time in team history, the Barrie Colts claimed top spot, moving ahead of the Saint John Sea Dogs of the Quebec Major Junior Hockey League. The Colts would remain in top spot until the end of the season, finishing with a league best record of 57–9–0–2.

Dale Hawerchuk (2010 to 2019)

2010–11 OHL Season

At the end of the 2009–10 season, Marty Williamson left the team. Dale Hawerchuk was named as the new Colts coach for 2010–11 season. Dalton Prout was named the 11th captain in franchise history. He was joined by Stephen Gaskin, Peter Di Salvo, Darren Archibald, Taylor Carnevale, and Colin Behenna as returning players from the 2009–10 playoff run. Also returning were Zach Hall, Mitch Bennett, Dean Pawlaczuk, and David Mazurek. The Colts started the year with 5 rookie defencemen, 7 rookie forwards, and a rookie back-up goaltender. David Mazurek, Dean Pawlczuk, and Chris Wiggin were released soon after the start of the season and players such as Alexander Burmistrov and Kyle Clifford made their respective NHL teams. After a 4–22–1–1 last place start to the season, the Colts traded Peter Di Salvo, Darren Archibald, Taylor Carnevale, Stephen Gaskin, and captain Dalton Prout before the trade deadline. This left Colin Behenna, Zach Hall, and Mitch Bennett as the only players left from the previous year's championship run. In return, the Colts received 17-year-old goalies John Chartrand and Josh Malecki as well as 17-year-old defenceman Alex Lepkowski and 17-year-old power forward Eric Locke. The team finished with 15 wins and missed the playoffs for the first time since they joined the OHL. After missing the playoffs for the first time in franchise history and finishing last overall in the OHL, the Colts were given the first overall draft pick in the 2011 OHL Priority Selection. Hawerchuk used the pick to select defenceman Aaron Ekblad, a 15-year-old who recently became the second player to be granted exceptional status by the CHL.

2011–12 OHL Season

Dale Hawerchuk began his second season as coach of the Barrie Colts with several trades. Players Josh Malecki, John Chartrand, Tyler Mort, Brandon Devlin, Mackenzie Braid, Kyler Nixon, Mitch Bennett, and Petr Beranek were traded off the team. In exchange, the Colts acquired Reid McNeill, Dereck Hartwick, Ivan Telegin, and Gregg Sutch. Several rookies made their debut this season including goalie Alex Fotinos, defencemen Aaron Ekblad, Alex Yuill and Jonathan Laser, as well as forwards Brendan Bell and Josh MacDonald. Forward Mark Scheifele began the season with the Winnipeg Jets, scoring a goal in the seven games he started in before being sent back to Barrie. After approximately one month in the season, all three forwards were in the top five in league scoring, with Tanner Pearson leading for the majority of the year. Because of his good start to the season, Tanner Pearson was selected to play in the CHL Top Prospects Game alongside fellow Colt Mark Scheifele. The two players would later play together in the IIHF U20 World Junior Championship. Daniel Erlich, Anthony Camara, and former Colt Ryan O'Connor were traded for during the season. Goalie Clint Windsor and forward Eric Locke were let go from the team. The Colts finished 3rd in the conference and faced the Mississauga team in the first round. The Colts beat the Majors in 6 games and faced the 2nd seed Ottawa 67's in the second round. After the Colts built a  3–1 series lead, injuries to forwards Tanner Pearson, Zach Hall, Steven Beyers, Gregg Sutch, and Ivan Telegin in game 7, as well as defencemen Ryan O'Connor, and Alex Yuill, would eventually take their toll. The Colts lost the next 3 games (including game 7 in overtime).

2012–13 OHL Season

The Barrie Colts would begin the season without the previous season's top scorers Tanner Pearson and Ivan Telegin who would play the season in the AHL. Overage defenceman Ryan O'Connor was named team captain. With the likes of Mark Scheifele, Anthony Camara, Steven Beyers, Zach Hall, and former London Knight Andreas Athanasiou, the Colts would continue to pack an offensive punch. Leading the way on defence were returnees Alex Yuill, Johnathan Laser, Aaron Ekblad, and Alex Lepkowski. Overager Mathias Neiderberger was stellar all year in goal. With this crop of experienced players, as well as a handful of rookies to fill in the gaps, the Colts would quickly take the top spot in the Eastern Conference; a position they would hold for the majority of the season. The Colts would also be ranked amongst the CHL Top Ten teams for most of the year as well. Throughout the season, many Colts would say goodbye through trades. Included in this group were Brendan Bell, Sammu Markula, Dylan Smoskowitz, and the Colts 2012 first round draft pick Brendan Perlini. In exchange they would receive many draft picks as well as defenceman Jake Dotchin, and forwards Devon Rymarchuk, and Mitchell Theoret in the hopes that the Colts could make a run deep into the playoffs. Over the Christmas Break, sophomore defenceman Aaron Ekblad would captain Team Ontario's Under 17 squad, and both Anthony Camara, and Mark Scheifele would make Team Canada's Under 20 team. Scheifele would soon after be recalled to the NHL after the lockout was settled. He would remain with the Winnipeg Jets until early February when he was returned to the OHL. The Colts would lock down the 2nd place seed in the Eastern Conference heading into the playoffs. After quickly beating the 7th seed Kingston Frontenacs and 3rd seed Oshawa Generals 4 games to 0 a piece, the Colts would meet the first place Belleville Bulls in the conference finals. The Colts would need 7 games to beat Belleville for a trip to the OHL Championships. No one gave the Colts a chance at winning this series as they would play the defending champions London Knights. After 4 games, the Colts would lead the series 3 games to 1. At this point, injuries to Mark Scheifele and suspensions (10 games for Ryan O'Connor, 5 games for Anthony Camara, and 5 games for Jake Dotchin) would catch up with the Colts. London would win game 5 at home and game 6 in Barrie in thrilling fashion. In game 6 London would hold a 4–0 lead with just over 10 minutes left in the third period. The Colts stormed back to score 4 goals before losing in overtime. In game 7 Barrie headed back to London where the game was tied 2–2 in the dying seconds of the third period. A miscommunication between the Colts players led to a turnover, and a London goal with 0.1 seconds remaining on the clock to deny the Colts a trip to the Memorial Cup. To add insult to injury, London was awarded the 2014 Memorial Cup early the next day; a tournament that Barrie also had a solid bid for.

2013–14 OHL Season

Despite losing the likes of leading scorers Mark Scheifele, Anthony Camara, Steven Beyers, Alex Lepkowski, Ryan O'Connor, and Mathias Neiderberger the Colts began the season as Eastern Conference favourites. Aaron Ekblad was named as team captain, and was expected to carry much of the defensive load. The season began slowly for the Colts, losing many of their opening games. After a few trades which sent goaltender Alex Fotinos and forward Josh MacDonald to Windsor and Peterborough respectively, the Colts found their stride, vaulting to near the top of the conference in November. Rookies forwards Matthew Kreis, Andrew Mangiapane, Cordell James, and Kevin Labanc, as well as rookie defenceman Josh Carrick, and Mackenzie Blackwood in goal each received plenty of ice time in this run which helped the Colts reach the top of their division. The middle of the season saw the Colts settle into the middle of the Eastern Conference standings. Rookie forward Matthew Kreis represented team Ontario in the World U17 Challenge, and captain Aaron Ekblad shouldered much of Team Canada's defensive load at the IIHF World Men's U20 Championship in Malmö, Sweden. Moves before the trade deadline sent Eric Bradford to the Ottawa 67's, Dylan Corson to Sault Ste. Marie Greyhounds and defenceman Alex Yuill to the Belleville Bulls in exchange for forwards Nick Patorious (Sault. Ste Marie), Garrett Hooey (Belleville), and Joseph Blandisi (Ottawa) as well as defenceman Mac Clutsam (Sault Ste. Marie). The Colts finished 4th in a tight race for the Central Division title, drawing the Sudbury Wolves in the first round. The Colts would dispose of the pesky Wolves in five games. In the second round the Colts would face the North Bay Battalion, eventually losing a tight defensive series in 6 games.

2014–15 OHL Season

The 2014–15 season marked Dale Hawerchuk's fifth season behind the Barrie Colts bench. With last season's captain Aaron Ekblad lost to the Florida Panthers, there was a large void on defense. Partway through the season overage forward Joseph Blandisi was named the sixteenth captain in franchise history. The season was one of highs and lows for the Colts franchise, with many individual records being set. Captain Joseph Blandisi, Kevin Labanc, and Andrew Mangiapane all broke the 100 point mark having scored 112, 107, and 104 points respectively. This marked the first time in franchise history that 3 players scored 100+ points in the same season. Captain Blandisi also became the second Colt to score over 50 goals, scoring 52 by season end. He also set a franchise mark for insurance goals, and fell one shy of the franchise record of short-handed goals with 10. Kevin Labanc broke the franchise record for assists with 76, Brendan Lemieux set the franchise mark for power play goals with 25, and Andrew Mangiapane tied the franchise mark with 5 short-handed assists. First-year import defenceman Rasmus Andersson led the Colts backend with 12 goals and 52 assists for a total of 64 points and goaltending prospect Mackenzie Blackwood once again was solid for the Colts in goal. The Colts made a few trades before the deadline, mostly to shore up their sometimes shaky defence, bringing in Brandon Prophet, Chad Baumann, Ben Harpur as well as forward Stephen Nosad. In the playoffs, the Colts made quick work of the Belleville Bulls, sweeping the series. They once again met the North Bay Battalion in the second round. The series held promise as both teams finished the season with 85 points; the Colts winning the central division based on a better win record. For the second straight year the Colts could not solve the Battalion system, losing the series in 5 games.

2015–16 OHL Season

The Colts would begin 2015-16 with mixed expectations. Mackenzie Blackwood was expected to once again be a huge presence in goal. On defense, offensively talented Rasmus Andersson, and overage captain Michael Webster returned and would be expected to log the majority of the minutes. They were joined by rookies Matt Brassard, Justin Murray, and Rocky Kaura as well as returning Brandon Prophet and Josh Carrick. On forward, 100-point scorer Joseph Blandisi left for the New Jersey Devils farm system, but fellow century scorers from the previous year, Kevin Labanc and Andrew Mangiapane would return.  Along with overager Justin Scott, explosive Brendan Lemieux, and import Julius Nättinen they would share the majority of the ice time on offense. The Colts first few games were a roller coaster ride. While their defense was surprisingly sound, their offense was sporadic. The start of the season was also marred by suspensions to Andrew Mangiapane, Mackenzie Blackwood; which would delay his World Junior start, and several to Brendan Lemieux which would lead to his off-loading to the Windsor Spitfires. Ironically, after the Lemieux trade, the Colts offense picked up and late in the season the division leading Colts decided to take a shot at making the finals by trading Rocky Kaura, Brandon Prophet and a bunch of draft picks in several deals for goalie David Ovjannikov, forwards Keigan Goetz and Dylan Sadowy as well as Cameron Lizotte, and Greg DiTomasso on defense. The Colts would again win the division in record-breaking fashion where once again Andrew Mangiapane and Kevin Labanc would score over 100 points, the latter breaking many franchise records in the process. In the playoffs the Mississauga Steelheads would take the Colts the distance before the Colts came out on top. The Colts would get their revenge in the next round, beating the North Bay Battalion in four straight, only to find themselves on the wrong side of a sweep in the conference finals by a surprise Niagara IceDogs team.

2016–17 OHL Season

The 2016-17 Colts roster would look much different from the one the previous year. One hundred point scorers Kevin Labanc and Andrew Magiapane had moved on to their respective AHL and NHL clubs. Mackenzie Blackwood would not return in goal. Also not returning was defensemen Michael Webster, Rasmus Andersson and Greg DiTomasso, and forwards Justin Scott, Keigan Goetz, Dylan Sadoway, and Julius Nättinen. The youth movement was on, as signaled by the blockbuster trade made preseason where the Colts sent a package including 10 draft picks to the Mississauga Steelheads in exchange for 16-year-old Russian Kirill Niznikov. The Colts season would be a tough one, having them spend the majority of the year in the basement of the league. Come trade deadline the Colts were active, trading captain Cordell James to the Owen Sound Attack, Cameron Lizotte to the Erie Otters, and Barrie native Matt Brassard to the Oshawa Generals while acquiring Robert Proner and Jason Smith from the Saginaw Spirit and Mississauga Steelheads. The Colts would finish off the year with the youngest roster in the OHL and finishing last place overall in the league. The Colts were awarded the number one overall draft pick who ended up being Ryan Suzuki.

Championships
OHL
Memorial Cup
 1999–2000—Finalists vs. Rimouski Océanic

J. Ross Robertson Cup Ontario Hockey League Championship—1 Championship, 3 Finalists
 1999–2000—Champions vs. Plymouth Whalers
 2001–02—Finalists vs. Erie Otters
 2009–10—Finalists vs. Windsor Spitfires
 2012–13—Finalists vs. London Knights

Bobby Orr Trophy
Eastern Conference Championship—4 Championships, 2 Finalists
 1999–2000—Champions vs. Belleville Bulls
 2001–02—Champions vs. Toronto St. Michael's Majors
 2005–06—Finalists vs. Peterborough Petes
 2009–10—Champions vs. Mississauga St. Michael's Majors
 2012–13—Champions vs. Belleville Bulls
 2015-16—Finalists vs. Niagara IceDogs

Emms Trophy
Central Division title—8 Championships
 1998–99—105 Points (First in Eastern Conference)
 1999–2000—93 Points (First in Eastern Conference)
 2006–07—97 Points (First in Eastern Conference)
 2009–10—116 Points (First in OHL)
 2012–13—92 Points (Second in Eastern Conference)
 2014–15—85 Points (Second in Eastern Conference)
 2015–16—89 Points (Second in Eastern Conference)
 2017-18—89 Points (Second in Eastern Conference)

Hamilton Spectator Trophy—1 Championship
Best Record in the League
 2009–10,—116 Points
(Finishing with a  57–9–0–2  record.  #1 in Canada for the final four weeks of the season)

OHA Jr. B
Sutherland Cup
Junior 'B' Championship
 1934–35 and 1992–93

Division titles
Central Junior 'B'
 1984–85, 1987–88, 1988–89, 1989–90, 1992–93

Coaches
Bert Templeton was the first coach for the OHL Colts. Templeton was awarded the OHL Executive of the Year in 1995–96 for his role as general manager. Templeton built the inaugural team of the Barrie Colts, who became the first OHL expansion franchise to make the playoffs in its first season.

List of coaches with multiple seasons in parentheses.
1995–1999 – Bert Templeton (4)
1999–2000 – Bill Stewart
2000–2004 – Bud Stefanski (4)
2004–2010 – Marty Williamson (6)
2010–2019 – Dale Hawerchuk (9)
2019–2020 – Warren Rychel (interim)
2020 – Todd Miller (interim)
2021–present – Marty Williamson

General managers
List of general managers with multiple seasons in parentheses.

1999–2000 – Bill Stewart
2006–2010 – Greg Carrigan
2011–2020 – Jason Ford
2021–present – Marty Williamson

Players

OHL Award winners
1995 – Daniel Tkaczuk – Jack Ferguson Award (First overall draft selection)
1998–1999 – Brian Finley – OHL Goaltender of the Year
1998–1999 – Brian Finley – Wayne Gretzky 99 Award (Playoffs MVP)
1998–1999 – Sheldon Keefe – Emms Family Award (Rookie of the year)
1999–2000 – Sheldon Keefe – Eddie Powers Memorial Trophy (Scoring champion) 
1999-2000 - Sheldon Keefe – Jim Mahon Memorial Trophy (Top Scoring right winger)
2000 – Eric Reitz and Sheldon Keefe – Memorial Cup All-Star Team
2001–2002 – Eric Reitz – Max Kaminsky Trophy (Most outstanding defenceman)
2003–2004 – Paulo Colaiacovo – OHL Goaltender of the Year
2003–2004 – Bryan Little – Emms Family Award (Rookie of the year)
2009–2010 – Bryan Cameron – Leo Lalonde Memorial Trophy (Overage player of the year)
2011 – Aaron Ekblad – Jack Ferguson Award (First overall draft selection)
2011–2012 – Aaron Ekblad – Emms Family Award (Rookie of the year)
2013-2014 - Aaron Ekblad – Max Kaminsky Trophy (Most outstanding defenceman)
2014–2015 – Joseph Blandisi – Leo Lalonde Memorial Trophy (Overage player of the year)
2015-2016 – Kevin Labanc – Eddie Powers Memorial Trophy (Scoring champion) 
2015-2016 - Kevin Labanc – Jim Mahon Memorial Trophy (Top scoring right winger)
2015–2016 – Kevin Labanc – Leo Lalonde Memorial Trophy (Overage player of the year)
2015–2016 – Michael Webster – Mickey Renaud Captain's Trophy (Leadership award)
2015–2016 – Mackenzie Blackwood – OHL Goaltender of the Year
2017 – Ryan Suzuki – Jack Ferguson Award (First overall draft selection)
2017-2018 – Aaron Luchuk – Eddie Powers Memorial Trophy (Scoring champion) 
2017-2018 – Aaron Luchuk – Leo Lalonde Memorial Trophy (Overage player of the year)
2017-2018 – Andrei Svechnikov – Emms Family Award (Rookie of the year)

CHL Award Winners
2017-2018 – Andrei Svechnikov – CHL Top Draft Prospect Award

NHL alumni
As of the 2022-23 NHL Season, there were 69 Barrie Colts alumni who have played in the National Hockey League: 58 from the OHL Colts, and 11 from the Junior B Colts.

Junior B Colts

Drake Berehowsky
Shayne Corson
Bruce Gardiner
Mike Hoffman
John Madden
Mike Prokopec
Craig Rivet
Darren Rumble
Darrin Shannon
Darryl Shannon
Shayne Stevenson

OHL Colts

Rasmus Andersson
Andreas Athanasiou
Darren Archibald
Ryan Barnes
Mackenzie Blackwood
Joseph Blandisi
Darryl Bootland
T. J. Brodie
Evan Brophey
Brad Brown
Jan Bulis
Alexander Burmistrov
Brandt Clarke
Kyle Clifford
Richard Clune
Jeff Cowan
B. J. Crombeen
Mike Danton
Stefan Della Rovere
Jake Dotchin
Aaron Ekblad
Brian Finley
Tyson Foerster
Daniel Girardi
Ryan Hamilton
Ben Harpur
Michael Hutchinson
Sheldon Keefe
Kevin Labanc
Dan LaCosta
Brian Lashoff
Brendan Lemieux
Bryan Little
Andrew Mangiapane
Mike Minard
Oskar Olausson
Adam Payerl
Tanner Pearson
Brendan Perlini
Jakub Petruzalek
Alex Pietrangelo
Dalton Prout
Eric Reitz
Zac Rinaldo
Mark Scheifele
Michael Sgarbossa
Denis Shvidki
Arturs Silovs
Martin Skoula
Givani Smith
Nick Smith
Ryan Strome
Andrei Svechnikov
Joey Tenute
Daniel Tkaczuk
Tyler Tucker
Alexandre Volchkov
Mike Weber

Team captains
List of captains with the number of seasons in parentheses.

1995–96 Brad Brown (1)
1995–96 Jeff Cowan (1)
1996–99 Daniel Tkaczuk (3)
1999–2000 Sheldon Keefe (1)
2000–01 Matt Dzieduszycki (1)
2001–02 Eric Reitz (1)
2002–04 Jeremy Swanson (2)
2004–05 B. J. Crombeen (1)
2005–07 Bryan Little (2)
2007–08 Tomas Marcinko (1)
2008–10 Stefan Della Rovere (2)
2010–11 Dalton Prout (1)
2011-12 Colin Behenna (1)
2012–13 Ryan O'Connor (1)
2013-14 Aaron Ekblad (1)
2014-15 Joseph Blandisi (1)
2015-16 Michael Webster (1)
2016-17 Cordell James (1)
2017-19 Justin Murray (2)
2019-20 Jason Willms (1) 
2019-20 Luke Bignell (0.5) 
2021-23 Brandt Clarke (1.5) 
2022-23 Declan McDonnell (0.5)

Yearly results

Regular season
 196x–78 Mid-Ontario Junior B League
 1978–93 Central Junior B League
 1993–95 OPJHL Junior A
 1995–Present OHL

Legend: OTL = Overtime loss, SL = Shootout loss

Playoffs
1969–70 Defeated Woodstock Navy-Vets 4-games-to-3 for George S. Dudley Trophy Super "C" Championship
1992–93 Defeated Kitchener Dutchmen 4-games-to-none for Sutherland Cup
1995–96 Lost to Kitchener Rangers 4 games to 3 in division quarter-finals.
1996–97 Defeated Owen Sound Platers 4 games to 0 in division quarter-finals. Lost to Ottawa 67's 4 games to 1 in quarter-finals..
1997–98 Lost to Sudbury Wolves 4 games to 2 in division quarter-finals.
1998–99 Defeated Kingston Frontenacs 4 games to 1 in conference quarter-finals. Lost to Oshawa Generals 4 games to 3 in conference semi-finals.
1999–2000 Defeated North Bay Centennials 4 games to 2 in conference quarter-finals. Defeated Sudbury Wolves 4 games to 3 in conference semi-finals. Defeated Belleville Bulls 4 games to 1 in conference finals. Defeated Plymouth Whalers 4 games to 3 in finals. OHL CHAMPIONS  Finished Memorial Cup round-robin in third place (1 win, 2 losses). Defeated Halifax Mooseheads 6–3 in semi-final game. Lost to Rimouski Oceanic 6–2 in championship game.
2000–01 Lost to Sudbury Wolves 4 games to 1 in conference quarter-finals.
2001–02 Defeated Sudbury Wolves 4 games to 1 in conference quarter-finals. Defeated Belleville Bulls 4 games to 2 in conference semi-finals. Defeated St. Michael's Majors 4 games to 0 in conference finals. Lost to Erie Otters 4 games to 1 in finals.
2002–03 Lost to Brampton Battalion 4 games to 2 in conference quarter-finals.
2003–04 Defeated Kingston Frontenacs 4 games to 1 in conference quarter-finals. Lost to Mississauga IceDogs 4 games to 3 in conference semi-finals.
2004–05 Lost to Ottawa 67's 4 games to 2 in conference quarter-finals.
2005–06 Defeated St. Michael's Majors 4 games to 0 in conference quarter-finals. Defeated Brampton Battalion 4 games to 1 in conference semi-finals. Lost to Peterborough Petes 4 games to 1 in conference finals.
2006–07 Defeated Brampton Battalion 4 games to 0 in conference quarter-finals. Lost to Sudbury Wolves 4 games to 0 in conference semi-finals.
2007–08 Defeated Brampton Battalion 4 games to 1 in conference quarter-finals. Lost to Belleville Bulls 4 games to 0 in conference semi-finals.
2008–09 Lost to Mississauga Majors 4 games to 1 in conference quarter-finals.
2009–10 Defeated Sudbury Wolves 4 games to 0 in conference quarter-finals. Defeated Brampton Battalion 4 games to 0 in conference semi-finals. Defeated Mississauga St.Michaels Majors 4 games to 1 in conference finals.  Lost to Windsor Spitfires 4 games to 0 in Finals.
2010–11 Did not qualify.
2011–12 Defeated Mississauga St. Michaels Majors 4 games to 2 in the conference quarter-finals. Lost to Ottawa 67's 4 games to 3 in conference semi-finals.
2012–13 Defeated Kingston Frontenacs 4 games to 0 in the conference quarter-finals. Defeated Oshawa Generals 4 games to 0 in conference semi-finals.  Defeated Belleville Bulls 4 games to 3 in the conference finals.  Lost to London Knights 4 games to 3 in Finals.
2013–14 Defeated Sudbury Wolves 4 games to 1 in the conference quarter-finals. Lost to North Bay Battalion 4 games to 2 in conference semi-finals.
2014–15 Defeated Belleville Bulls 4 games to 0 in the conference quarter-finals. Lost to North Bay Battalion 4 games to 1 in conference semi-finals.
2015-16 Defeated Mississauga Steelheads 4 games to 3 in the conference quarter-finals. Defeated North Bay Battalion 4 games to 0 in conference semi-finals. Lost to Niagara IceDogs 4 games to 0 the conference finals.
2016–17 Did not qualify.
2017–18 Defeated Mississauga Steelheads 4 games to 2 in the conference quarter-finals. Lost to Kingston Frontenacs 4 games to 2 in conference semi-finals.
2018–19 Did not qualify.
2019–20 OHL Playoffs were cancelled due to the COVID-19 pandemic.
2020–21 OHL Regular Season and Playoffs were cancelled due to the COVID-19 pandemic.
2021-22 Lost to Mississauga Steelheads 4 games to 2 in conference quarter-finals.

Uniforms and logos
The Barrie Colts logo displays an angry horse holding a hockeystick, surrounded by a horseshoe. The Colts colours are red, white, navy blue & gold. The home uniforms are a white background, with red, navy blue and gold trim. The away uniforms are a navy blue background, with red, white & gold trim. Barrie also briefly used a third jersey which was a red background, with white, navy blue & gold trim.

For the 2007–08 season, the Colts have worn a new third jersey. It has a navy blue blackground with white, red and gold trim along the bottom, with the word "Colts" diagonally across the front. For the 2009–10 season the colts wore the Rbk Edge uniforms with a new template.

Arenas
The Barrie Colts played at the Barrie Arena during their tenure in the Junior B days and Junior A Tier II days, and also for a portion of their inaugural OHL season until their new arena was completed. The Barrie Arena was located in downtown Barrie and was formerly home to the Barrie Flyers OHA team from 1945–1960 and other senior hockey teams. The Arena was torn down in 2008.

Barrie Molson Centre was completed during the early portion of the 1995–96 season. The layout of the arena served as a blueprint for many new OHL arenas built shortly thereafter. The Horsepower Grill restaurant is located at the west end of the arena. The Barrie Molson Centre is located near the southern entrance of Park Place, close to Highway 400.  The arena has since been renamed "The Barrie Colts Centre" and then, pursuant to a 10-year naming rights agreement with Paul Sadlon Motors Inc. for $170,121 per year (for a total of $1,701,210), beginning in the Colts' 2021-22 season, the "Sadlon Arena". 

Capacity = 4,195
Ice Size = 200' x 85'

Arena profiles from "The OHL Arena & Travel Guide"
 Barrie Arena
 Barrie Molson Centre

See also
List of ice hockey teams in Ontario

References

External links
www.barriecolts.com Official web site
Ontario Hockey League Official web site
Canadian Hockey League Official web site

Sport in Barrie
Ontario Hockey League teams
Ice hockey clubs established in 1994
1994 establishments in Ontario